Kwekwe, originally known as Que Que, is a district in Zimbabwe.

Location
It is found in the Midlands Province, in the central Zimbabwe. Kwekwe, with an estimated population of about 99,200 in 2004, is the capital city of the district.
The coordinates of Kwekwe District are:19° 0' 0.00"S, 29° 45' 0.00"E (Latitude:19.0000; Longitude:29.7500).

Governance
Kwekwe District has two urban subdivisions Kwekwe Municipality (Kwekwe City Council) and Redcliff Municipality (Redcliff Town Council). The third subdivision is the caretaker of the rural part of Kwekwe District, Zibagwe Rural District Council usually called Kwekwe Rural District Council.

There are 60 rural district councils from Zimbabwe's 8 non-metropolitan provinces. Midlands Province has 8 Rural District Councils:
 Gokwe North RDC in Gokwe North District
 Gokwe South RDC in Gokwe South District
 Mberengwa RDC  in Mberengwa District
 Runde RDC in Zvishavane District
 Takawira RDC  in Chirumhanzu District
 Tongogara RDC in Shurugwi District
 Vungu RDC in Gweru District
 Zibagwe RDC in Kwekwe District

The District Administrator (DA) is the chief senior civil servant overseeing the administration of the district. He is an ex-officio in both the urban and rural councils and he exerts considerable power in both.

There are 5 constituencies wholly in Kwekwe District, Redcliff, Mbizo, Kwekwe Central, Silobela and Zhombe. The sixth constituency Churumanzu-Zibagwe has only three wards in Kwekwe District while the rest are in Churumanzu District.

Among these only Kwekwe Central and Redcliff fall under urban councils while the rest fall under the Rural District Council. However some parts of Redcliff Constituency are rural.

Kwekwe District Urban covers the city of Kwekwe run by Kwekwe Municipality (Kwekwe City Council) and Redcliff run by Redcliff Town Council, both councils existent according to Chapter 29.15 of the Urban Councils Act.

Kwekwe Rural is that part of the district that does not fall under the jurisdiction of Redcliff Town Council and Kwekwe City Council. This part is run by a Rural District Council, the rural equivalent of an urban council formed by the Local Government according to Chapter 29.13 of the Rural District Councils Act.

The rural part of Kwekwe District is governed by Zibagwe Rural District Council.

Kwekwe, then spelt Que Que, was called Sebakwe before the assumption of the name Que Que hence Zibagwe Rural for Kwekwe Rural.
 
Kwekwe District has a total of 67 wards:
 15 Kwekwe municipal wards,
 9 Redcliff municipal wards
 33 rural district council wards.

Kwekwe Municipality has 15 wards;
 9 in Kwekwe Central Constituency
 6 in Mbizo Constituency.

Redcliff Municipality has 9 wards yet Redcliff Constituency has 13 wards;
 9 municipal wards
 4 rural wards. These 4 wards are under Zibagwe Rural District Council.

Zibagwe RDC has a total of 33 wards;
 4 under Redcliff Constituency,
 11 under Zhombe Constituency,
 14 under Silobela Constituency
 4 under Churumanzu-Zibagwe Constituency.

Kwekwe Urban
Kwekwe Urban District is administered by two urban councils established in terms of the Zimbabwe Urban Councils Act, Chapter 29.15

Kwekwe Municipality
Kwekwe Municipality has jurisdiction over 14 wards in Kwekwe Central Constituency and Mbizo Constituency.

Kwekwe City Council 2013 - 2018
Source: Zimbabwe Electoral Commission

Kwekwe mayor is Clr. Matenda Madzoke

2008 - 2013 Council
All councillors in this term were from MDC-T. Source: Kubatana Aechive

The mayor for this term is Clr. Shadreck Tobaiwa

Redcliff Municipality

2013 - 2018 Town Council
All councillors are from Redcliff Constutuency. Source: Zimbabwe Electoral Commission

2008 - 2013 Council
Source: Kubatana Aechive

Overview
The district is rich in minerals including gold and iron ore. The largest steel manufacturing factory, Zimbabwe Iron and Steel Company (ZISCO), is located in the district in the town of Redcliff, near the city of Kwekwe, the district capital. The district contains many large and small mines and several large steel mills.

It is located in the tropics but its high altitude modifies this to a warm temperate climate. As with much of the Highveld, summers are long but not hot as the temperature depends on the amount of cloudiness and indirectly the amount of rain received. Drought years are hotter than wet years. The climate is hot and wet during the summer rainy season from mid November to mid March, with cool, dry weather from May to mid-August in the winter season, and warm dry weather from August to mid November.

Population
The population census of 1992 estimated the population of the district at 249,705. In 2004, the district population was estimated at 289,039 people. The next national population census in Zimbabwe is scheduled from 18 August 2012 through 28 August 2012.

See also
 Districts of Zimbabwe
 Provinces of Zimbabwe

References

 
Districts of Midlands Province